This was the first edition of the tournament.

Zizou Bergs won the title after defeating Altuğ Çelikbilek 6–4, 3–6, 6–4 in the final.

Seeds

Draw

Finals

Top half

Bottom half

References

External links
Main draw
Qualifying draw

Saint Petersburg Challenger - 1